Klokotnitsa Ridge (‘Hrebet Klokotnitsa’ \'hre-bet klo-'kot-ni-tsa\) is the rounded ice-covered ridge extending 12 km in north-south direction, 4 km wide and rising to 1600 m on Trinity Peninsula in Graham Land, Antarctica. It is situated on the northwest side of Detroit Plateau, with two northerly offshoots of the ridge forming Dragor Hill and Borovan Knoll. The feature has steep and partly ice-free west, north and east E slopes surmounting Whitecloud Glacier to the west and McNeile Glacier to the east.

The ridge is named after the settlement of Klokotnitsa in Southern Bulgaria.

Location
German-British mapping in 1996.

Maps
 Trinity Peninsula. Scale 1:250000 topographic map No. 5697. Institut für Angewandte Geodäsie and British Antarctic Survey, 1996.
 Antarctic Digital Database (ADD). Scale 1:250000 topographic map of Antarctica. Scientific Committee on Antarctic Research (SCAR), 1993–2016.

Notes

References
 Bulgarian Antarctic Gazetteer. Antarctic Place-names Commission. (details in Bulgarian, basic data in English)
 Klokotnitsa Ridge. SCAR Composite Antarctic Gazetteer

External links
 Klokotnitsa Ridge. Copernix satellite image

Landforms of Trinity Peninsula
Bulgaria and the Antarctic